Cyanobacterium  genus of cyanobacteria.

References

Cyanobacteria genera
Chroococcales